Ancystrocheira is a genus of moths belonging to the family Tineidae. It contains only one species, Ancystrocheira porphyrica, which is found on Madagascar.

References

Tineidae
Monotypic moth genera
Moths of Madagascar
Tineidae genera